Austin Murphy is an American author and journalist who wrote for Sports Illustrated for 33 years before corporate downsizing made him an Amazon.com delivery truck driver.
After working for Amazon, Murphy was recently hired as a writer for the Santa Rosa (Calif.) Press Democrat.

Books
 The Sweet Season: A Sportswriter Rediscovers Football, Family, and a Bit of Faith at Minnesota's St. John's University (2001)
 How Tough Could It Be?: The Trials and Errors of a Sportswriter Turned Stay-at-Home Dad
 Saturday Rules: A Season with Trojans and Domers (and Gators and Buckeyes and Wolverines)  (2007)

References

External links
HarperCollins' author bio

Living people
Sportswriters from Massachusetts
American sportswriters
Year of birth missing (living people)